The 2002 Euroleague Final Four was the concluding Euroleague Final Four tournament of the 2001–02 Euroleague season. The event was hosted form 3 till 5 May 2002, and all games were played at the PalaMalaguti, in Bologna.

Bracket

Semifinals

Final

Awards

Euroleague Final Four MVP 
  Dejan Bodiroga ( Panathinaikos)

Euroleague Finals Top Scorer 
  Manu Ginóbili ( Kinder Bologna)

External links 
 Official website

2001-02
Final Four
International basketball competitions hosted by Italy
2001–02 in Italian basketball
2001–02 in Greek basketball
2001–02 in Israeli basketball
Sport in Bologna